Mexican Gangster is a 2008 action film, starring Damian Chapa and John Loretto. The movie was written by Carlton Holder and Damian Chapa and directed by Damian Chapa.

Plot
A group of Mexican gangsters led by Johnny Sun, try to survive in their turf, after being ratted out by his little brother.

Cast
 Damian Chapa as Johnny Sun
 John Loretto as Brooklyn Bob
 Bougart Linares as George Washington 
 Monica Ramon as Corta
 Tom Druilhet as Detective Pappos
 Amor Sanchez as Olga
 Tommy Stender as Little Johnny
 Ricco Chapa as Ricky
 Brienne De Beau as Carolina
 Andrew Trujillo as Detective Roland

Reception
On Rotten Tomatoes, Mexican Gangster has an approval rating of 86% based on reviews from 7 critics.

References

External links
 
 

2000s English-language films
Films directed by Damian Chapa